The Crossed Keys Tavern, also known as the Cross Keys Tavern is a historic  stone building located in Turtlecreek Township near Lebanon, Ohio. It is across the Little Miami River from the former Fort Ancient village. Built in 1802, it was operated as a tavern from 1809–1820.

On October 21, 1976, it was added to the National Register of Historic Places.

See also
 List of Registered Historic Places in Warren County, Ohio
 Cross keys (disambiguation)

References

National Register of Historic Places in Warren County, Ohio
Commercial buildings on the National Register of Historic Places in Ohio
Buildings and structures in Warren County, Ohio
Commercial buildings completed in 1802
Taverns in Ohio